McRory is a surname. It is derived from the Irish surname Mac Ruaidhrí.

Art McRory, Northern Irish Gaelic football manager
John McRory (1834–1893), Canadian merchant and politician

See also
McCrory (disambiguation)
Mackrory, surname

Citations

References

Anglicised Irish-language surnames
Patronymic surnames
Surnames from given names